The Grande Prêmio São Paulo is a race for thoroughbred horses which are 3 years old or more (3yo+).

It is the most important race in the São Paulo racing calendar, and one of the most important in the Brazilian racing calendar.

First held in 1923, this is also one of the oldest races still active in the Brazilian racing calendar.

Race Day
May, a Sunday, each year.

Records since 2000

Speed Record:

 2:24.49 – Dono da Raia (2006)

Most wins:

No horse has won this race more than once since 2000

Most wins by a jockey:

 2 – W. Blandi (2002, 2009)
 2 – Jorge Ricardo (2005, 2021)

Most wins by a trainer:

 4 – Venãncio Nahid (2008, 2009, 2010, 2012)
 2 – Dulcino Guignoni (2000, 2011)
 2 – Roberto Solanes (2016, 2019)
 2 – M. André (2018, 2021)

Most wins by an owner:

 3 – Stud TNT (2005, 2010, 2017)
 2 – Haras Regina (2016, 2019)

Winners

ƒ designates a filly or mare winner

Earlier Winners 

 1923: Mehemet Ali
 1924: Eden
 1925: Aprompto
 1926: Printer
 1927: Frayle Muerto
 1928: POns
 1929: Santarem
 1930: Flutter
 1931: Bury
 1932: Arco Iris
 1933: Good Money ƒ
 1934: Algarces
 1935: Sargento
 1936: Formasterus
 1937: Timely
 1938: Maritain
 1939: Simpatico
 1940: Race not run
 1941: Teruel
 1942: Tenor
 1943: Latero
 1944: Albatroz
 1945: Fumo
 1946: Miron
 1947: Coraly ƒ
 1948: Garbosa Bruleur ƒ
 1949: Saravan
 1950: Zonzo
 1951: Jocosa ƒ
 1952: Gualicho
 1953: Gualicho
 1954: Quiproquo
 1955: Adil
 1956: Adil
 1958: Dulce ƒ
 1959: Atlas
 1960: Farwell
 1961: Arturo A
 1962: Arturo A
 1963: Sing Sing
 1964: Snow Crown
 1965: Maanim
 1966: Trenzdo
 1967: Tagliamento
 1968: Moustache
 1969: Decorum
 1970: Severus
 1971: Viziane
 1972: El Virtuoso
 1973: Figuron
 1974: Moraes Tinto
 1975: Gadahar
 1976: Big Poker
 1977: Mogambo
 1978: Donetica ƒ
 1979: Tibetano
 1980: Dark Brown
 1981: Rasputin
 1982: Clackson
 1983: Kenetico
 1984: As de Pique
 1985: Bretagne ƒ
 1986: Cisplatine ƒ
 1987: Grimaldi
 1988: Ken Graf
 1989: Troyanos
 1990: Jex
 1991: Thignon Lafre
 1992: Urban Hero
 1993: Vomage
 1994: Much Better
 1995: Val de Grace
 1996: Rafaga Surena ƒ
 1997: Quemay
 1998: Quari Bravo
 1999: Sweet Eternity ƒ

ƒ designates a filly or mare winner

References 

Horse races in Brazil